Heather B. Armstrong (née Hamilton, born July 19, 1975) is an American blogger who resides in Salt Lake City, Utah. She writes under the pseudonym of Dooce, a pseudonym that came from her inability to quickly spell "dude" during online chats with her former co-workers.

Armstrong was raised a member of the Church of Jesus Christ of Latter-day Saints (LDS Church) in Memphis, Tennessee, and majored in English at Brigham Young University in Provo, Utah, graduating in 1997. She then left the church and moved to Los Angeles to work. Armstrong married web designer Jon Armstrong and returned to Salt Lake City to work as a consultant and designer herself. Her blog, started in 2001, cost Armstrong her job the following year after her coworkers discovered she had been writing about them; after her termination she continued it, focusing on her parenting struggles and eventually running ads in 2004. Five years later she had 8.5 million viewers a month and was reportedly making over $100,000 annually from banner ads on Dooce. Armstrong appeared on Oprah and was featured by Forbes magazine among 30 honorees on its list of "The Most Influential Women In Media" for 2009.

In 2012 the Armstrongs announced they were separating, divorcing later that year. They have two children together: Leta Elise (born 2004), and Marlo Iris (born 2009). Since the divorce, she and former Senate candidate Pete Ashdown have become romantically involved and live together.

In the mid-2010s, readership of Dooce began to decline due to the influence of social media. In the wake of her divorce, and criticism of her and her blog online, Armstrong retreated from regularly blogging and confronted her depression. After an experimental treatment in 2017 proved successful, she resumed her previous Internet posting, albeit to a much smaller audience, and began making money as an influencer, although she is critical of the practice.

Early life

Armstrong was born Heather Hamilton in 1975 and raised in Memphis, Tennessee. Raised in the LDS Church, she began having doubts about it and experiencing bouts of depression while a student at Brigham Young University (BYU) in predominantly Mormon Utah. After graduating in 1997, she left both the church and state, relocating to Los Angeles where she found work as a web developer for startups during the dot-com boom.

"Dooced"
In 2002, Armstrong ignited a fierce debate about privacy issues when she was allegedly fired from her job as a web designer and graphic artist because she had written satirical accounts of her experiences at a dot-com startup on her personal blog, dooce.com.

"Dooced" can mean "getting fired for something you've written on your website", a sense humorously disavowed by Armstrong in her blog's FAQ. This definition was used by the television game show Jeopardy! on December 10, 2009, as evidenced by a screenshot on her blog the following day.

Armstrong kept blogging in the wake of her termination, and through a mutual friend met Jon Armstrong, another former Mormon web developer from Utah. They married and returned to their home state to start a family. In 2004, after the couple's first child was born, Armstrong began devoting much of her blog to parenting, becoming one of the first mommybloggers.

Dooce.com
Armstrong has written extensively and humorously of her struggle with depression, entering a mental health hospital, as well as her pregnancies, parenthood, and her experiences with the LDS Church. She has called BYU one of the worst places that exist and said that she left the Church the day after she graduated since her diploma was withheld over a $20 unpaid parking ticket that she had incurred after being unable to find a legal parking spot for a mandatory church service.

Armstrong says the following about her site, dooce.com, which began in February 2001 with a post about Carnation Milk: "Since then I have published more than 5,300 entries covering topics such as breast milk pumps, golf cart rides with Norah Jones, and the one guy I dated who talked like Elmo during sex."

In 2004, Armstrong accepted text advertisements on her website for the first time, a decision that was controversial among her readership. The following year, Armstrong accepted graphic ads and wrote that the revenue from the advertisements would be her family's principal source of income while her husband made the transition to manage her advertising and business. Since then, she has appeared in Suave advertisements that feature her own image and trademark. In 2009, Armstrong again received mass media attention for using Twitter to get her washing machine fixed.

By that year, ads visible to Dooce's 8.5 million monthly readers made a reported $40,000 for the Armstrongs each month, making it her primary source of income; she began running sponsored content as well. She appeared on Oprah and, along with Oprah herself, was included in Forbes list of the 30 Most Influential Women in Media. In November of that year, Armstrong introduced a new, interactive section to her website that allows registered users to post questions and responses.  Armstrong introduced this new section, the Dooce Community, by posting an entry (11/2/09) on the main dooce.com page:

Dooce.com has received multiple nominations and awards from The Weblog Awards, including a lifetime achievement award for Armstrong in 2008.

Dooce also attracted attention from websites devoted to making sardonic and critical observations about lifestyle bloggers, such as Get Off My Internets and the subreddit blogsnark. The mostly female readers of those forums second-guessed Armstrong's parenting decisions and suggested she did not appreciate how privileged she was. Heather responded by posting hate mail she received from the readers of those sites on a separate page, which she has since taken down, called "Monetizing the Hate"; Jon joked in 2011 that the traffic from the hate sites had been better for the family business than the birth of their second child two years earlier. By then the revenue from Dooce paid salaries not only to the Armstrongs but an assistant and two full-time babysitters.

Divorce, hiatus and depression

The Armstrongs announced they were separating in 2012; Heather posted to Dooce explaining why while Jon posted on his blog, Blurbomat. At the time the announcement came as a surprise since Heather had never written about any marital difficulties, and had often written positively of her husband's support for her during her struggles with the children and her depression. Later, she said the couple had at that point been in counseling for years; Jon was "controlling and punishing" and expected her to just get over the negative commentary on her site.

The divorce was finalized the following year. Jon moved to New York City with a new girlfriend; the Armstrong children spend the summer with him. By that time the audience for blogs that had been so large in the 2000s was starting to dissipate; many readers moved on to social media and other once-popular blogs shut down.

In 2015, Armstrong announced that she would be taking a step back from blogging in order to focus on speaking and consulting work. While she was able at first to travel and make speaking engagements, and do some freelance marketing work, she soon found the pressures of single parenthood overwhelmed her. Depression returned and by 2017, Armstrong says she felt like "a heap of nothingness" and could not go on living.

That year she enrolled in a clinical trial at the University of Utah's Neuropsychiatric Institute. Over 10 sessions, she was put into an induced coma for 15 minutes, an action meant to simulate brain death. After the treatment, she felt well enough to resume blogging as regularly as she had before 2015, and also published The Valedictorian of Being Dead, a book about her experience.

Late 2010s

Armstrong returned to a different Internet. Most lifestyle bloggers like her had been replaced by, or evolved into, influencers. "Mommy blogging is dead, and I think most of my colleagues would agree", she told Vox in 2019.

Armstrong still does sponsored content, gets affiliate marketing revenue from Stitch Fix and Amazon, and now maintains an Instagram feed in addition to her blog. Dooce still gets a half million readers per month, most of them from her following a decade earlier. She does not post any pictures or anecdotes about her children without their approval. In addition to her standard material about her parenting and family issues, Armstrong also posts about mental health issues such as those she herself has faced. "I want people with depression to feel like they are seen,” she says, “especially here in Utah, where teen suicide is an epidemic." Eventually, she told Vox, she wants to start a nonprofit devoted to the subject.

Pete Ashdown, a tech entrepreneur and two-time Democratic candidate for the U.S. Senate seats from Utah, has become Armstrong's boyfriend and now lives with her and her children. He, too, is a former Mormon.

Books
In late 2005, Armstrong entered into negotiations with Kensington Books to produce two books, one of which was to be a memoir of early parenthood. The negotiations broke down in May 2006, and Kensington sued to force Armstrong to fulfill the terms of the unsigned contract. In October 2006 both parties agreed to a settlement which allowed Armstrong to seek another publisher.

Kensington Books released a book of essays, Things I Learned About My Dad: In Therapy, on April 29, 2008, edited by Heather B. Armstrong.

Her second book, It Sucked and Then I Cried: How I Had a Baby, a Breakdown, and a Much Needed Margarita was released on March 24, 2009, and published by Simon Spotlight Entertainment. It reached #16 on The New York Times Bestseller List for April 12, 2009.

The Valedictorian of Being Dead was released in 2019.

Other ventures
Armstrong was a music columnist and consultant for the Alpha Mom media network. She and her ex-husband ran Armstrong Media, LLC, a web design, advertising and content-generation business. , Jon Armstrong runs it without her. She also was a panelist for the online video series Momversation.

In late 2009, Armstrong announced a partnership with the television network HGTV in which she would "work with HGTV’s online and on-air production teams to create innovative convergence programming for the network." While the bulk of her partnership activities began in the spring of 2010, Armstrong began contributing weekly content to the network's Design Happens blog in February 2010.  Her last post on Design Happens was in September 2010.

See also

List of Brigham Young University alumni
List of family-and-homemaking blogs
List of former or dissident LDS
List of people from Memphis, Tennessee
List of people from Salt Lake City

References

External links
Dooce.com
Interview with Lance Armstrong

1975 births
American women bloggers
American bloggers
Brigham Young University alumni
Living people
Writers of blogs about home and family
Former Latter Day Saints
People with mood disorders
Writers from Salt Lake City
Writers from Memphis, Tennessee
21st-century American women